Károly Teppert (born 20 July 1891, date of death unknown) was a Hungarian cyclist. He competed in two events at the 1912 Summer Olympics.

References

External links
 

1891 births
Year of death missing
Hungarian male cyclists
Olympic cyclists of Hungary
Cyclists at the 1912 Summer Olympics
Cyclists from Budapest